Joseph Bristow may refer to:

 Joseph L. Bristow (1861–1944), American Republican politician from Kansas
 Joseph Bristow (literary scholar), professor of English literature at UCLA